Zelleria isopyrrha is a moth of the family Yponomeutidae. It is found in Australia, from Busselton to Albany in Western Australia.

External links
Australian Faunal Directory

Yponomeutidae